The 2006 Senior Open Championship, also named the Senior British Open Championship or, for sponsor reasons, Senior British Open Championship presented by Aberdeen Asset Management, was a senior major golf championship and the 20th Senior Open Championship, held on 27–30 July at Turnberry Golf Resort in South Ayrshire, Scotland, United Kingdom. It was the fourth Senior Open Championship played as a senior major championship.

Loren Roberts won over Eduardo Romero in a playoff for the title. It was Roberts' second senior major championship victory.

Venue 

The Ailsa Course at Turnberry, situated 80 kilometres south of Glasgow, Scotland, on headland along the Firth of Clyde, overlooking the Isle of Arran and Ailsa Craig, was initially opened with 13 holes in 1901, designed by Willie Fernie, and later completed to 18 holes. It was redesigned by Mackenzie Ross between 1949 and 1951. 

It was the fourth Senior Open Championship played at Turnberry. The course had also previously hosted The Open Championship three times; 1977, 1986 and 1994.

Card of the course
Ailsa Course

Field
The field consisted of 144 competitors; 139 professionals and five amateurs.

18-hole stroke play qualifying rounds were held on Monday, 24 July, on three places in Scotland, Dundonald Links Golf Club, the Kintyre Course at Turnberry and The Irvine Golf Club, for players who were not already exempt. The 43 leading players from the qualifying competitions joined the 101 exempt players for the championship.

78 players made the 36-hole cut, all of them professionals and no amateurs.

Past champions in the field
Six past Senior Open champions participated. Two of them made the 36-hole cut; 2003 and 2005 champion Tom Watson (tied 23rd) and 1988, 1990 and 1997 champion Gary Player (tied 65th). 1989 and 1993 champion Bob Charles, 1987 champion Neil Coles, 2004 champion Pete Oakley and 2002 champion Noboru Sugai did not make the cut.

Past winners and runners-up at The Open Championship in the field 
The field included three former winners of The Open Championship. Two of them made the cut; 1975, 1977, 1980, 1982 and 1983 Open champion Tom Watson (tied 23rd) and 1959, 1968 and 1974 Open champion Gary Player (tied 65th). 1963 Open champion Bob Charles did not make the cut.

The field also included seven former runners-up at The Open Championship; Gordon J. Brand (tied 10th), Tom Kite (tied 10th), Hale Irwin (tied 13th), Mark McMulty (tied 27th), Andy Bean (tied 35th), Simon Owen (tied 47th) and Neil Coles (missed cut).

Final round and playoff summaries

Final round
Sunday, 30 July 2006

Loren Roberts and Eduardo Romero tied the lead after the fourth round, to meet in a sudden death playoff, to decide the winner. Roberts lost a four-shot lead after finishing with a five over par round of 75, including two double bogeys on the back nine holes.

Playoff
Sunday, 30 July 2006

The sudden-death playoff went on the 18th hole, to be played until one of the players had a lower score on the hole than the other. Loren Roberts beat Eduardo Romero with a par at the first extra hole. Roberts holed a 15 footer for par, while Romero three-putted from 40 feet for bogey.

References

External links 
 Coverage on European Tour website

Senior major golf championships
Golf tournaments in Scotland
Senior Open Championship
Senior Open Championship
Senior Open Championship